The Château d'Orrouy is an historic castle in Orrouy, Oise, Hauts-de-France, France.

History
The castle was built in the 15th century. It was redesigned in the Gothic Revival architectural style in the 19th century.

The castle was inherited by Count Armand Doria, an art collector who invited painters Jean-Baptiste-Camille Corot and Édouard Manet for short visits, and Adolphe-Félix Cals and Gustave-Henri Colin as extended guests.

Architectural significance
It has been listed as an official historical monument since March 30, 1989.

References

Châteaux in Oise
Monuments historiques of Hauts-de-France
Buildings and structures completed in the 15th century